Armando Javier Dely Valdés (5 January 1964 – 17 August 2004) was a Panamanian footballer who played as a forward. He was the elder brother of the twins Julio Dely Valdés and Jorge Dely Valdés.

Club career
He started his playing career with Técnica y Deportes in Panama.
 
In 1983, he was signed by Argentinos Juniors and went on to win a number of major titles with the club. They were back-to-back league champions in the Metropolitano 1984 and the Nacional 1985. They went on to win the Copa Libertadores in 1985 and the 1985 Copa Interamericana, and played in the Copa Intercontinental against Juventus of Italy.

Nicknamed Pelé, Dely Valdés left Argentinos Juniors for another Argentine team, Instituto de Córdoba. He went on to play for San Martín de Tucumán in Argentina, Maccabi Tel Aviv and Beitar Tel Aviv in Israel, Peñarol and Liverpool in Uruguay.

International career
Dely Valdés represented his country in 4 FIFA World Cup qualification matches His final international was a December 1995 UNCAF Nations Cup match against Guatemala.

Retirement and death
After retiring as a  player he worked as the assistant manager of the Panama national team between 1996 and 2001 and became the coach of the Panama Under-20 team in 2001. He also managed Plaza Amador and Árabe Unido.

On May 29, 2001, Daly Valdés suffered a heart attack which left him in a coma from which he never recovered. He was left in a permanent vegetative state in which he suffered sepsis and lung infections amongst other complications. He died in the Manuel Amador Guerrero Hospital in Colón in 2004. After his death, the Panamanian Football Federation renamed the Árabe Unido football stadium to Estadio Armando Dely Valdés.

Honours

Club
Argentinos Juniors
Primera División Argentina: 1984, 1985
Copa Libertadores: 1985

References

External links

 Clarín obituary
 La Prensa obituary

1964 births
2004 deaths
Sportspeople from Colón, Panama
Association football forwards
Panamanian footballers
Panama international footballers
C.D. Árabe Unido players
Argentinos Juniors footballers
Instituto footballers
San Martín de Tucumán footballers
Maccabi Tel Aviv F.C. players
Beitar Tel Aviv F.C. players
Peñarol players
Liverpool F.C. (Montevideo) players
C.D. Plaza Amador players
Panamanian expatriate footballers
Expatriate footballers in Argentina
Expatriate footballers in Uruguay
Expatriate footballers in Israel
Panamanian expatriate sportspeople in Argentina
Panamanian expatriate sportspeople in Israel
Panamanian expatriate sportspeople in Uruguay
Argentine Primera División players
1993 CONCACAF Gold Cup players